= Northern Acres, Gauteng =

Northern Acres
- Location within Gauteng Location within South Africa
- Coordinates: 26.088°S 28.049°E
- Country: South Africa
- Province: Gauteng
- Municipality: City of Johannesburg
- Time zone: UTC+2 (SAST)
- Postal code (street): 2196

Northern Acres is a suburb of Johannesburg, South Africa. It is located in Region E of the City of Johannesburg Metropolitan Municipality.
